Anastasija Babović (born 13 December 2000) is a Montenegrin female handball player for SCM Craiova, and the Montenegrin national team.

She represented Montenegro at the 2020 European Women's Handball Championship.

References

External links
 
 

2000 births
Living people
Sportspeople from Podgorica
People from Berane
Montenegrin female handball players
Olympic handball players of Montenegro
Handball players at the 2020 Summer Olympics
Montenegrin expatriate sportspeople in Hungary
Expatriate handball players